The Sonning Common Health Walks was set up in 1996 by Dr William Bird, who is a general practitioner in Reading, Berkshire, England. The walks aim to reduce heart disease, reduce cholesterol and blood pressure, relieve depression and anxiety, reduce stress, help with weight management / obesity, and help with diabetes. Each walk is led by a Leader who is a trained volunteer. The leaders know the route. You walk at your own pace but you are advised to  stretch yourself to raise your heart rate and get you breathing faster.

Bird set up health walks from his practice in Sonning Common, Oxfordshire, and then worked with the Countryside Agency and the British Heart Foundation to expand it nationally.

References

External links 
Sonning Common Health Walks

Health in Oxfordshire
Walking in the United Kingdom